Harvey J. Kaye (born October 9, 1949) is an American historian and sociologist.

Kaye is an author of several political books including “Thomas Paine and the Promise of America”, and “The Fight for the Four Freedoms”. He has appeared as an expert on several political news shows and podcasts  including “Bill Moyers Journal” and “That’s Jacqueline”. He is a regular guest on The David Feldman Show.

Kaye is a Professor Emeritus of Democracy & Justice Studies and the Director of the Center for History and Social Change at the University of Wisconsin–Green Bay.

Personal life
Kaye was born in Englewood, NJ.

Bibliography
 Take Hold of Our History: Make America Radical Again
 The Fight for the Four Freedoms: What Made FDR and the Greatest Generation Truly Great 
 Thomas Paine and the Promise of America
 Thomas Paine: Firebrand of the Revolution (young adult biography)
 The British Marxist Historians Polity Press, Cambridge, 1984, 
 The Powers of the Past
 The Education of Desire
 "Why do Ruling Classes Fear History" and Other Questions Are We Good Citizens? 
 E.P. Thompson: Critical Perspectives The American Radical''

Citations

Living people
Writers from Wisconsin
University of Wisconsin–Green Bay faculty
21st-century American historians
21st-century American male writers
Deutscher Memorial Prize winners
1949 births
American male non-fiction writers